Benito Manuel Agüero (1624–1668) was a Spanish painter of the Baroque period, active mainly in Madrid as a landscape and battle painter.

Agüero was born in Burgos.  He was a favorite of the King Philip IV. He was a pupil of Juan Bautista Martínez del Mazo. He died in Madrid.

References

Further reading

Aterido Fernández, Ángel, Corpus Alonso Cano: documentos y textos, Madrid, Ministry of Education, Culture and Sports, 2002,  p. 249.
Fernández García, Matías, Parroquia madrileña de San Sebastián. Algunos personajes de su archivo, Madrid, 1995, p. 133.
Barrio Moya, José Luis, El platero palentino Melchor de Astudillo, tasador de las joyas y objetos de plata de doña Bernardina Hurtado y Valdivieso (1665), PITTM, 80, Palencia, 2009, pp. 493–502, p. 495.
Palomino, Antonio (1988). El museo pictórico y escala óptica III. El parnaso español pintoresco laureado. Madrid : Aguilar S.A. de Ediciones. .
Pérez Sánchez, Alfonso E. (1992). Baroque Painting in Spain 1600–1750. Madrid : Ediciones Cátedra. .
Urrea, Jesús y otros (1995). Painters During the Reign of Philip IV (Pintores del reinado de Felipe IV). Madrid : Museo del Prado. .

External links

 Benito Manuel Agüero at the Museo del Prado. 

1626 births
1668 deaths
People from Burgos
17th-century Spanish painters
Spanish male painters
Painters from Castile and León
Spanish Baroque painters